Winad may refer to:

Microsoft Windows Active Directory
WinAd, adware affecting Microsoft Windows systems